"Seven Steps to Heaven" is a 1963 jazz composition by Victor Feldman and Miles Davis. Different lyrics to it were written much later by Cassandra Wilson and Jon Hendricks. This iconic jazz standard was introduced in 1963 by the Miles Davis Quintet. Although Feldman played and recorded with Davis in Los Angeles on Seven Steps to Heaven, and he appears on half of the tracks of the album, the West Coast-based pianist did not want to follow Davis to New York, where the album version of the composition was finally recorded with Herbie Hancock on piano.

Composition
Seven Steps to Heaven is a 32-bar composition in AABA form; it has an intro, an interlude and an ending - but these are the same. It was originally played in an up-tempo swing style.

See also
List of post-1950 jazz standards

References

External links
learn to play it

1963 songs
1960s jazz standards
Compositions by Miles Davis
Songs with lyrics by Jon Hendricks